The Choix River is a river located in the municipality of Choix in the state of Sinaloa, in northwestern Mexico. It is part of the Fuerte River watershed.

References

Rivers of Sinaloa
Rivers of the Sierra Madre Occidental
Rivers of Mexico